Silver Dust is a Swiss rock band formed in 2013 in Porrentruy by the singer and guitarist Lord Campbell. He is especially known under his real name, Christian "Kiki" Crétin, as former professional ice hockey goaltender. After having performed on various stages in Switzerland, including the Montreux Jazz Festival, Silver Dust gained popularity throughout Europe thanks to their tours with the heavy metal Finnish bands Lordi (2016 and 2018) and Battle Beast (2017).

At the end of 2019, Silver Dust started their fourth European tour consisting of 50 dates in 26 countries together with Moonspell and Rotting Christ.

Silver Dust has their unique music style brightened up with a scenic presence on stage composed of steampunk and Victorian influences. The band is often classified as "Burtonian" (referring to American filmmaker Tim Burton) by the media that describe its style under the name of "theatrical rock".

History

Creation and early years — Lost In Time (2013-2015) 
Silver Dust was formed in 2013 by singer and guitarist Lord Campbell. After having led many personal musical projects covering the songs of guitar-virtuosos such as Steve Vai and Joe Satriani, he decided to create a project that combines music and theatrical show. For that, he engaged the services of his faithful bassist and longstanding friend, Kurghan, who has been present since the beginning.

On May 25, 2013, Silver Dust released their first album, Lost In Time. A few months later, the band performed at the famous Montreux Jazz Festival and was chosen as the opening act in many national festivals, which offered them the opportunity to play together with renowned bands such as Deftones, The Offspring, Eluvietie or Mass Hysteria. In addition, the song So Let Me Now was broadcast on the radio across Switzerland and its music video was a considerable success.

In the course of 2014, two changes were made in the line-up. Firstly, the drummer Cedric was invited to leave the band and was replaced by Mr.Killjoy. A few months later, Jayer, the guitarist, decided to dedicate himself to his personal projects and was replaced by Tiny Pistol.

In February 2015, the band entered the studio to record their second album. They also announced the filming of a music video. At the end of the year, Silver Dust began a collaboration with the Swiss label Escudero Records.

Rise — The Age Of Decadence (2016-2017) 
In early 2016, Silver Dust unveiled the name and cover of their new album named The Age Of Decadence. On February 6, 2016, the band released the second music video of its history for one of the songs of the new album, My Heart Is My Savior.

On March 4, 2016, Silver Dust plays for the first time the songs of the new album, The Age Of Decadence, during a concert organized especially for the occasion in Neuchâtel. During the same night, the band also unveiled a new show thought up to go along with the album using an atmosphere combining the good and the bad, often represented by references to white magic and black magic. A large screen representing a magic mirror appears on stage and is used to show images in relation to the songs being played. In addition, the show is marked by the appearance of many actors, including a cursed couple and some characters dressed with black cloaks and masks.

On April 7, 2016, Silver Dust won the finale of a contest organized by the famous Greenfield Festival and, as a result, was selected to share the stage with Nightwish and Amon Amarth. A few weeks later, the bands released a new music video in collaboration with Carlyn Monnin, a Swiss lyric soprano, who puts her voice on the unplugged version of the song Forgive Me.

In the same year, Silver Dust hit the road for their first European tour together with the Finnish heavy metal band Lordi. The bands performed more than thirty times all over Europe.

After this tour, Silver Dust signed with the German label Fastball Music that arranged the release of the album The Age Of Decadence across the continent

In November 2017, the quartet returned on European stages as the special guest of the Finnish heavy metal band Battle Beast. At the end of the year, Silver Dust ended "The Age Of Decadence" tour by announcing the upcoming release of their third album.

Revelation — House 21 (2018-present) 
In late March 2018, Silver Dust released a music video for Forever, a single from the album. In a similar way to the previous music videos, this one is filmed in Porrentruy in Switzerland.

On April 20, 2018, the band released its third opus, House 21, in the form of a concept album. It tells the story of a British soldier deserting the battlefield during World War II and taking refuge in a gloomy dwelling, called House 21, populated by errant souls and strange characters. The album includes a collaboration with Mr. Lordi, from the eponym band, on a cover of Bette Davis Eyes.

A few months later, to everyone's great surprise, Mr.Killjoy, the drummer, announced his desire to leave the band. He is then replaced by Magma, drummer formed by Diego Rapacchietti from the Swiss band Coroner.

In October of the same year, the band went on another tour with Lordi. This new tour marks the second large-scale collaboration between the two bands.

In July 2019, Silver Dust announced that their fourth European tour would take place at the end of the year, from October to December. For this occasion, the band toured with two well-known metal bands: Moonspell and Rotting Christ.

On March 1, 2020, the band announced the arrival of their new guitarist, Neiros. He replaces Tiny Pistol who has judged not being anymore able to fulfill his role in the band due to personal issues.

Members

Current members 

 Lord Campbell – lead vocals, guitar
 Kurghan – bass, backing vocals
 Neiros – guitar, backing vocals
 Magma – drums

Former members 

 Tiny Pistol – guitar, backing vocals (2014-2020)
Mr.Killjoy – drums (2014-2018)
 Jayer – guitar, backing vocals (2013-2014)
 Cedric – drums (2013-2014)

Discography

Studio albums 

 2013 : Lost In Time
 2016 : The Age Of Decadence
 2018 : House 21

Music videos 

 2014 : So Let Me Know
 2016 : My Heart Is My Savior
 2016 : Forgive Me (unplugged version)
 2018 : Forever

References 

Swiss rock music groups